Francis Fynn (born 13 July 1950) is a Ghanaian politician and a teacher. He is a member of the First Parliament of the Fourth Republic of Ghana representing the Ahanta West Constituency in the Western Region of Ghana.

Early life and education 

Francis Fynn was born on 13 July 1955, at Ahanta West in the Western Region of Ghana. He attended the University of Cape Coast and obtained his Bachelor of Science Education.

Politics 

He was first elected into Parliament on the ticket of the National Democratic Congress for the Ahanta West Constituency in the Western Region of Ghana. The 1992 Ghanaian general elections was the first elections held in the country after 11 years of military rule by Jerry John Rawlings. He served one term as a member of Parliament. He lost his seat to his opposition Samuel Kwofie of the New Patriotic Party during the 1996 Ghanaian General Elections.

Career 

He is a Teacher.

Personal life 
He is a Christian.

References 

Living people
1950 births
National Democratic Congress (Ghana) politicians
University of Cape Coast alumni
Ghanaian educators
Ghanaian Christians
People from Ashanti Region
Ghanaian MPs 1993–1997